Ice Blast (formerly Tango Ice Blast and PlayStation: The Ride!), is a S&S Worldwide drop tower ride located at Blackpool Pleasure Beach in Blackpool, England. It is named after the drink of the same name. This ride also replaced a flatride in the park called Monster.

History 
Prior to 1997, Blackpool Pleasure Beach decided to build a Launched Freefall ride in the park. When Sony approached the park as a sponsor for the ride, it was decided that the ride would tie in with the current success from the marketing of Sony PlayStation products. Shortly after being built, the tower was painted white, with the interior structure painted red and the platform grey, black and amber, the colours associated with PlayStation. Banners advertising PlayStation were placed on the car and the top of the tower also sported the such logo. Naturally, the ride was named PlayStation: The Ride. The ride opened in the Pleasure Beach in 1997, it was the first Tower ride in the UK. In 2002, the ride was renamed Ice Blast following a new sponsor and in 2004 was named Tango Ice Blast, in conjunction with the drink of the same name. The ride is notably similar to the Lucozade Space Shot that was located in Pleasureland Southport. The ride has undergone numerous changes including installing a new seating arrangement which was originally 3x3 across on all sides to 2x4 across. It is the 2nd tallest drop tower ride in the United Kingdom after The Volcano at Fantasy Island, but is the fastest.

Ride experience 
Riders are restrained using over the shoulder restraints and a seatbelt. There is a blast of air which sends the gondola to the top of the tower, this is followed by a second blast, in which the gondola reaches 2/3 of the way up  the tower, there is then a small blast of air sending the gondola 1/3 of the way up the tower. During the descent, the riders might experience weightlessness for a brief second.

References

External links 
 Ice-Blast Official Site
 Pleasure Beach Blackpool Official Site

Blackpool Pleasure Beach
Amusement rides manufactured by S&S – Sansei Technologies
Drop tower rides
Tango (drink)
Amusement rides introduced in 1997
Towers completed in 1997